Missing white woman syndrome is a term which is used by social scientists and media commentators in reference to the media coverage, especially on television, of missing-person cases involving young, attractive, white, upper middle class women or girls compared to the relative lack of attention towards missing women who were not white, of lower social classes, or of missing men or boys. Although the term was coined in the context of missing-person cases, it is sometimes used of coverage of other violent crimes. The phenomenon has been highlighted in the United States, Canada, the United Kingdom, South Africa, Australia, New Zealand, and other predominantly white countries.

American news anchor Gwen Ifill is widely considered the originator of the phrase. Charlton McIlwain defined the syndrome as "white women occupying a privileged role as violent crime victims in news media reporting", and posited that missing white woman syndrome functions as a type of racial hierarchy in the cultural imagery of the U.S. Eduardo Bonilla-Silva categorized the racial component of missing white woman syndrome as a "form of racial grammar, through which white supremacy is normalized by implicit, or even invisible standards".

The phenomenon has led to a number of tough-on-crime measures, mainly on the political right, that were named for white women who disappeared and were subsequently found harmed. In addition to race and class, factors such as supposed attractiveness, body size, and youthfulness have been identified as unfair criteria in the determination of newsworthiness in coverage of missing women. News coverage of missing black women was more likely to focus on the victim's problems, such as abusive boyfriends, criminal history, or drug addiction, while coverage of white women often tended to focus on their roles as mothers, daughters, students, and contributors to their communities.

Origin of the phrase
American news anchor Gwen Ifill is credited with originating the phrase at the Unity: Journalists of Color journalism conference in 2004. At the conference, she said "I call it the missing white woman search syndrome. If there is a missing white woman you're going to cover that every day."

Studies, reports and analyses

United States

In 2003, the San Francisco Chronicle published an article detailing the disparity between the coverage of the Laci Peterson case, and that of Evelyn Hernandez, a Hispanic woman – both of whom disappeared in 2002.

A report that aired on CNN in 2006 noted the differences in the level of media coverage given to missing white women (such as Laci Peterson and Natalee Holloway), when compared to the level of coverage given to LaToyia Figueroa, a pregnant black Hispanic woman. Figueroa disappeared in Philadelphia in 2005, the same year Holloway disappeared.

A 2010 study of news coverage of missing children found that black missing children cases were significantly underrepresented, when compared to national statistics. Missing black girls were significantly underrepresented in national news reporting. The coverage of death cases for black boys was significantly greater than expected. Coverage of non-black female kidnapping cases was greater than expected. A subsequent study found that children from minority groups, especially black children, were more likely to remain missing for longer periods of time.

A 2013 study that addressed media coverage of missing children, focusing on gender, but not race, found that "the results revealed that gender and age play only a minor role in deciding which abduction incidents are covered by newspapers, as well as the extent to which they are reported on. Specifically, newspapers dedicated more words to female victims than male victims, and reported more on younger children (aged 11 and under) than older children (aged 12 and over) when they were the victim of a nonfamily abduction."

In 2015, a report was published that re-examined the results from Min and Feaster's 2010 study about media coverage of missing children and confirmed that the media coverage of white missing persons was disproportionate compared to non-whites; but found that the coverage of females was not as biased as the 2010 study concluded.

In 2016, Zach Sommers, a sociologist at Northwestern University, published a study explaining that while there is a sizable body of research that shows that white people are more likely than people of color to appear in news coverage as victims of violent crime, there is relatively little when it comes to missing persons cases. Sommers cross-referenced the missing persons coverage of four national and regional media outlets against the FBI's missing persons database and found that black people were disproportionately less likely to appear in the news when compared to their rates of missingness; he also found that among those missing persons who appeared in the news, the coverage was much more intense (i.e., more articles were written) for white women and girls than other demographic groups.

Professor Eduardo Bonilla-Silva theorised that the subtle standard of placing a premium on white lives in the news helps to maintain and reinforce a racial hierarchy with whites at the top. For example, black women are members of both a marginalized racial group and a marginalized gender group. Crucially, though, black women have an "intersectional experience [that] is greater than the sum of racism and sexism". In other words, like white women, black women are subject to sexism, but the form of that sexism differs for black women because of the compounding effects of racial discrimination; with missing white woman syndrome being a pertinent manifestation of this social phenomenon. Some sociologists have argued that the tone of media coverage for black female victims differs markedly from coverage of white female victims in that the former are more likely to be blamed for purportedly putting themselves in harm's way, either knowingly or unknowingly. Victim blaming in this context reinforces the notion that black female victims are not only less innocent, but also less worthy of rescue relative to white women. Other observers note the lack of publicity given to black female victims of police brutality in news coverage, attributing the silence to a tradition of "sexism and patriarchy" in American society.

Kym Pasqualini, president of the National Center for Missing Adults, observed that media outlets tend to focus on "damsels in distress"—typically, affluent young white women and teenagers.

In a 2016 Esquire article about the disappearance of Tiffany Whitton, journalist Tom Junod observed that white women of lower social status, such as Whitton, a 26-year-old unemployed drug addict who was on parole, do not get much media attention, as "media outlets are ruthlessly selective, and they tend to prefer women who are white, pretty, and, above all, innocent." Whitton's mother stated that producers of shows like Nancy Grace told her they weren't interested in her daughter's case. Dr. Cory L. Armstrong wrote in The Washington Post, "the pattern of choosing only young, white, middle-class women for the full damsel treatment says a lot about a nation that likes to believe it has consigned race and class to irrelevance."

In 2017, a research paper from the University of South Florida studied media coverage and found that " ... disparities in coverage were seen based on race and age. In addition, the narratives of the reports were framed as cautionary tales, and victims were seen as active participants in their disappearance."

In 2019, two criminologists, Danielle C. Slakoff from California State University, Sacramento and Henry F. Fradella from Arizona State University, published an open-access research article about the Missing White Woman Syndrome. They examined 4 years' worth of coverage in 11 different U.S. newspapers. Slakoff and Fradella found that White missing women and girls received more initial and repeated coverage than missing black women.

Between 2007 and 2020, the National Crime Information Center (NCIC) database maintained by the Criminal Justice Information Services Division of the Federal Bureau of Investigation (FBI) saw an annual average of 664,776 missing person files entered into its database. In its 2020 compilation of NCIC missing and unidentified person files (which included 543,018 and 8,284 files respectively for the year), the FBI found that of the missing person files for the whom the person's race and sex were known, 321,830 (or approximately 61.3 percent) were White or Hispanic, 182,529 (or approximately 34.8 percent) were Black, 10,776 (or approximately 2.1 percent) were Asian, and 9,571 (or approximately 1.8 percent) were Native American, while 264,760 (or approximately 50.5 percent) were male, 159,029 (or approximately 30.3 percent) were White or Hispanic women, and the only racial category with more female files than male was Native Americans. For the 80,442 active missing person files at end-of-year, 48,710 (or approximately 60.6 percent) were White or Hispanic, 28,201 (or approximately 35.1 percent) were Black, 2,035 (or approximately 2.5 percent) were Asian, and 1,496 (or approximately 1.9 percent) were Native American, while 44,048 (or approximately 54.8 percent) were male and 20,990 (or approximately 26.1 percent) were White or Hispanic women.

In comparison, Whites and Hispanics accounted for 61.6 percent and 18.7 percent respectively of the U.S. population in the 2020 United States census (or 80.3 percent combined), while Blacks accounted for 12.4 percent, Asians accounted for 6 percent, and Native Americans accounted for 1.1 percent. In its 2020 Demographic Analysis, the United States Census Bureau estimated that the male-to-female sex ratio in the United States ranged from 98.1:100 to 98.2:100. However, only 13 states require that local police departments enter missing or unidentified person files into the National Missing and Unidentified Persons System. Additionally, in its 2019 Uniform Crime Report, the FBI found that 54.7 percent of murder victims in the United States for whom their race was known were Black and that 78.3 percent for whom their sex was known were male, while approximately 14 percent of the U.S. population as a whole was Black in the Census Bureau's 2019 American Community Survey and the Census Bureau estimated that the U.S. population retained the female majority in its sex ratio.

The Wyoming Urban Indian Health Institute published a study in 2020, by professor Emily A. Grant, which found that 710 Indigenous people were reported missing in the state of Wyoming between 2011 and 2020, and assessed the media coverage, and concluded that media coverage of Indigenous and people of color was significantly less than coverage of missing white people.

Canada
According to a 2008 study published in The Law and Society Association, aboriginal women who go missing in Canada receive 27 times less news coverage than white women; they also receive "dispassionate and less-detailed, headlines, articles, and images".

United Kingdom
In January 2006, the London Metropolitan Police Commissioner, Ian Blair, accused the media of ‘institutional racism’ in its reporting of murders. He contrasted the reporting of the death of the male white lawyer Tom ap Rhys Price with the murder of the male Asian builders' merchant Balbir Matharu. He said ‘murders in minority communities do not seem to interest the mainstream media’. He said that the death of Damilola Taylor, a 10-year-old black boy, was clearly an exception to this. He said he had been surprised at how much coverage the murders of two 10-year-old white girls in Soham had received.

University of Leicester Criminology Professor Yvonne Jewkes cites the murder of Milly Dowler, the murder of Sarah Payne, and the Soham murders as examples of "eminently newsworthy stories" about girls from "respectable" middle-class families and backgrounds whose parents used the news media effectively. She writes that, in contrast, the killing of Damilola Taylor, a 10-year-old boy from Nigeria, initially received little news coverage, with reports initially concentrating upon street crime levels and community policing in London, and largely ignoring the victim. Even when Damilola's father flew into the UK from Nigeria to make press statements and television appearances, the level of public outcry did not, Jewkes asserts, reach "the near hysterical outpourings of anger and sadness that accompanied the deaths of Sarah, Milly, Holly, and Jessica". However, according to the BBC, the killing of Damilola Taylor had shocked the UK.

Two cases of missing-white-girl syndrome that have been given as contrasting examples: the murder of Hannah Williams and the murder of Danielle Jones (both were white). It was suggested that Jones received more coverage than Williams because Jones was a middle-class schoolgirl, whilst Williams was from a working-class background with a stud in her nose and estranged parents. Another explanation for the difference in the coverage has been given: the eroticisation of the victim by news reports about a sexual relationship between Jones and her murderer, her uncle.

South Africa
Sandile Memela, chief director for social cohesion at South Africa's Department of Arts and Culture, noted amidst the Oscar Pistorius trial that there existed substantial differences between how media outlets reported on the murders of Reeva Steenkamp and Zanele Khumalo; two South African models, respectively white and black, who had been murdered by their boyfriends under nearly identical circumstances. Memela asserted that the discrepancy between the media coverage of the Steenkamp and Khumala murders amounted to "structural racism" within South African society, and stated: "As a country we seem to have chosen to ignore the agony, pain and suffering of the Khumalo family for no other reason than that they are black."

On September 11, 2014, the South African news network SABC3 aired an investigative report which raised concerns around the "Missing White Woman Syndrome"; where the death of Steenkamp was juxtaposed with the death of Zanele Khumalo.

Analogous cases that do not involve missing persons
Social scientists have reported biases in media coverage for other situations that involve white women, but are not missing-person cases.

Jessica Lynch

Social commentaries pointed to media bias in the coverage of soldier Jessica Lynch versus that of her fellow soldiers, Shoshana Johnson and Lori Piestewa. All three were ambushed in the same attack during the Iraq War on March 23, 2003, with Piestewa being killed, and Lynch and Johnson being injured and taken prisoner. Lynch, a young, blonde white woman, received far more media coverage than Johnson, a black single mother, and Piestewa, an Indigenous Hopi single mother from an impoverished background, with media critics suggesting that the media gave more attention to the woman with whom audiences supposedly more readily identify.
 
Lynch herself leveled harsh criticism at this disproportionate coverage that focused only on her, stating in a congressional testimony before the United States House Committee on Oversight and Government Reform:

Presumed kidnapping of "blonde angel" in Greece
In October 2013, a girl estimated to be about four years of age was found in the custody of a Roma couple in Greece and was presumed to have been abducted. The story about the "blonde angel" and the search for her biological parents received international media coverage. A Romani rights activist commented on the case to say "imagine if the situation were reversed and the children were brown and the parents were white." The child was later identified as Maria Ruseva. Her biological mother was a Bulgarian Roma who gave Maria up for adoption.

Murder trial defendants
Critics have also cited excessive media coverage of murder trials where the defendant is female, white, young and attractive, and included them along with Missing White Woman Syndrome instances in an all-encompassing narrative nicknamed the "woman in jeopardy" or "damsel in distress" genre. In such cases, the media will focus on the accused, rather than the victim as in Missing White Woman Syndrome cases, and they will be more ambiguous about their guilt than in other criminal cases regardless of evidence. Cited examples include Amanda Knox, Jodi Arias and Casey Anthony.

Laws named after missing white women and girls
Several laws have been created in the aftermath of disappearance cases, and are sometimes informally named after the missing person. Commentators have observed that disappearances of white women give rise to such laws more often than missing non-white women or missing men. Such laws in the United States include Laci and Conner's Law (named after Laci Peterson), Amber alert laws (Amber Hagerman), Jessica's Law (Jessica Lunsford), Caylee's Law (Caylee Anthony), Megan's Law (Megan Kanka), Dru's Law (Dru Sjodin), Lori's law (Lori Hacking), Kristen's Act (Kristen Modafferi), and Skylar's Law (Skylar Neese).

Examples

Missing white woman syndrome
The following missing-person cases have been cited as instances of missing-white-woman syndrome by media commentators. The commentators stated that these missing persons garnered a disproportionate level of media coverage relative to non-white, or less-wealthy, or male missing persons.

Missing persons who did not receive comparable media attention

The following missing person cases have been used as counterexamples by social scientists or media commentators. These are missing person cases which, according to the source, did not receive as much media attention they would have received if they were white, or female, or more affluent.

See also
 Attention inequality
 Damsel in distress
 Institutional racism
 Male expendability
 Media bias
 Missing and murdered Indigenous women
 Racial hierarchy
 White privilege
 White supremacy

References

Notes

Further reading
 
 Missing Woman Ignored Because She's Black? article about the lack of coverage around Athena Curry's disappearance, missing since May 2011.

External links
blackandmissing.org – Black and Missing But Not Forgotten

2004 neologisms
Class discrimination
Criticism of journalism
Media bias
 
Race and society
Sexism
Social phenomena
Social classes
White privilege